Gisela Stein (2 October 1935 – 4 May 2009) was a German actress.

Biography
Stein was born in Swinemünde (now Świnoujście, Poland) and educated at the Wiesbaden actors school. She began her stage career in Koblenz, Krefeld-Mönchengladbach and Essen with Erwin Piscator. In 1960 Stein moved to Berlin, where she worked for the next 19 years. Stein appeared also at the  Schauspielhaus Zürich, the Staatstheater Stuttgart and the Salzburg Festival. In 1980 she moved to Munich, where she stood at the Munich Kammerspiele until 2001.

Stein died on 4 May 2009 at Mohrkirch, Schleswig-Holstein, aged 73, from undisclosed causes.

Selected filmography
 Derrick - Season 10, Episode 10: "Dr. Römer und der Mann des Jahres" (1983)
 "Ich räume auf" (Putting Things Straight) - TV movie with Gisela Stein playing the part of poetess Else Lasker-Schüler, main female representative of German Expressionism. The film was first broadcast on 23 December 1979 by Westdeutscher Rundfunk. It was shown at the 1980 International Film Festival Rotterdam. director: Georg Brintrup

Awards
 1988 Deutscher Kritikerpreis
 Berliner Kunstpreis 
 Berliner Staatsschauspielerin 
 Bayerischer Maximiliansorden für Wissenschaft und Kunst 
 Bayerischer Verdienstorden 
 Bundesverdienstkreuz 
 2001 Oberbayerischer Kulturpreis
 2004 Hermine Körner-Ring

References

External links
 

1935 births
2009 deaths
People from Świnoujście
German television actresses
German stage actresses
People from the Province of Pomerania
Recipients of the Cross of the Order of Merit of the Federal Republic of Germany
20th-century German actresses